Soganaclia roedereri is a moth of the subfamily Arctiinae first described by Paul Griveaud in 1970. It is found in northern Madagascar where it seems to be confined to the high altitudes of the Tsaratanana Massif.

The wingspan is about 15–16 mm, with a length of the forewings of 7–8 mm.

References

Arctiinae
Lepidoptera of Madagascar
Moths described in 1970
Moths of Madagascar
Moths of Africa